Abul Hossain Mia is a Bangladesh Nationalist Party politician and a member of parliament for Faridpur-2.

Career
Mia was elected to parliament from Faridpur-2 as an Bangladesh Nationalist Party candidate on 15 February 1996, the election which was uncontested and later got cancelled. He also contested in the 1991 election where his security deposit was confiscated due to lowest number of votes. He did not further contest in any other election.

During the army backed care take government in 2007, Mia was accused of a number of extortion, kidnapping and arson cases. Most of these cases are still under judicial trial.

References

Bangladesh Nationalist Party politicians
Date of birth missing (living people)
6th Jatiya Sangsad members